A list of films produced in Russia in 2018 (see 2018 in film).

Film releases

Cultural Russian films
 Kursk is a 2018 French-Belgian drama film directed by Thomas Vinterberg. 
 Red Sparrow is a 2018 American spy thriller film directed by Francis Lawrence.
 The White Crow is a 2018 British biographical drama film directed by Ralph Fiennes. The film has an international cast which includes Russian and Ukrainian actors.

See also
 2018 in film
 2018 in Russia

References

External links

2018
Films
Russia